Monger is a surname. Notable people with the surname include:

Adrian Monger (born 1932), Australian Olympic rower
Billy Monger (born 1999), British racing driver
Ceri Monger, bass player with New Model Army 
Christopher Monger (born 1950), Welsh film director
Frederick Monger (1863–1919), Australian politician
George Monger (1840–1887), English recipient of the Victoria Cross
James Monger (21st century), Canadian geologist
John Monger (1831–1892), Australian politician
John Henry Monger Snr (1802–1867), migrant to Western Australia in 1829
Tom Monger, harpist with Florence and the Machine

See also
 Monger (disambiguation)

Occupational surnames